Eric Millikin is an American artist and activist based in Detroit, Michigan. He is known for his pioneering work in artificial intelligence art, augmented and virtual reality art, conceptual art, Internet art, performance art, poetry, post-Internet art, video art, and webcomics. His work is often controversial, with political, romantic, occult, horror and black comedy themes. Awards for Millikin's artwork include the Pulitzer Prize.

Together, Millikin and Casey Sorrow created and popularized the international animal rights holiday World Monkey Day.

Early life and education
Millikin is a descendent of Mary Eastey, who was executed for witchcraft during the Salem Witch Trials.

He began drawing horror art by age one-and-a-half, and by second grade, he was making teachers profane birthday cards showing his school burning down. Millikin began posting comics and art on the internet using CompuServe in the early 1980s, and began publishing on the World Wide Web in the early 1990s.

Millikin attended art school at Michigan State University in their Honors College. He paid his way through school by working in the school's human anatomy lab as an embalmer and dissectionist of human cadavers. While at art school, Millikin was homeless and lived in a car. He earned a Master of Fine Arts at Virginia Commonwealth University School of the Arts in 2021.

Notable artworks 

Millikin's art often includes self-portraits as well as portraits of celebrities and political figures. His work often incorporates mixed media and found objects, such as packages of candy, paper currency, and spiders. His large-scale artwork takes full advantage of the internet's formal possibilities, and has incorporated animation and winding "infinite canvas" designs, going beyond the limited sizes and shapes of conventional printed pages. Millikin's works range from those made almost completely of text (including calligraphy, typography, anagrams, ambigrams, free verse, and cut-up technique poetry) to those that are optical illusions or completely abstract. In 2002, Millikin was an editor (along with Tom Hart) and contributing artist of the online alternative comics anthology Serializer. In 2005, Millikin was one of the artists in the Clickwheel collective that published on the video iPod.
 The Birth of a Vampire Nation: A 2019 artificial intelligence horror film created with AI trained on the films The Birth of a Nation and Nosferatu: A Symphony of Horror , and videos of human blood cells and stars.  The soundtrack is composed with AI trained on human heartbeats and radio waves from outer space.
 CHARYBDIS-3: A spiraling video of infinite duration, created with artificial intelligence and facial recognition trained on endangered plants and animals, and projected on to a waterfall. The project's name comes from the sea monster Charybdis from Greek mythology. The endangered species referenced in the video are species whose fates have been profoundly impacted by global climate change.
Danger Beasts: Since 2016, Millikin has created the Danger Beast series of street art portraits of endangered animals created out of endangered plants, including a portrait of Harambe the gorilla made from Venus flytraps.
 Made of Money, a series of portraits of accomplished historical figures who died in poverty, created from cut up paper currency woven together. Portraits in the series have included Nikola Tesla, Hedy Lamarr, Joe Louis, Vincent Van Gogh, and Edgar Allan Poe. Millikin created the portraits as a statement on economic inequality, as a reminder "that our best people aren't always rewarded with wealth, and that our wealthiest people aren't always our best." As part of the ArtPrize festival in 2017, Millikin created a small fold-up book of the series and installed it inside one of the small PO Boxes at the local Post Office, as a critique of the large scale pieces that typically dominate the festival. Since the ArtPrize festival was created by the wealthy family of President Donald Trump's Education Secretary Betsy DeVos, the installation was widely seen as an attack on the greed and unearned wealth of DeVos and Trump. 
 Totally Sweet, a series of pop art, large-scale portraits of monsters, each created from thousands of packages of Halloween candy and a single spider. Millikin uses over 40 different kinds of candy, and a single portrait can take between 5,000 and 10,000 candies. Included in the series are portraits of such monsters as Freddy Krueger, Lily Munster, Gort, Godzilla and the Bride of Frankenstein. Millikin compares his artistic technique of building large monsters from many smaller parts to the similar techniques Victor Frankenstein used to create his monster.
 Hollywood Witch Trials, a series of painted portraits of celebrities like Paris Hilton and Lindsay Lohan based on their crime mug shots, stylized to look like witches, and combined with excerpts from transcripts of the Salem Witch Trials. The portraits are characterized by brilliantly colored paint brushed and smeared into expressionist swirls and spirals.
 American Mayhem, a series that uses optical illusions to transform the flag of the United States into cityscapes filled with monsters, and incorporates ambigram calligraphy that reads when the paintings are hung upside down. Inverting a national flag in such a way is a commonly used distress signal.
 , a series of early digital comics, from the 1980s, which were the first webcomics ever published. This unauthorized Wizard of Oz parody comic was published by Millikin on CompuServe as early as 1985 when he was in elementary school. Publishing on CompuServe allowed Millikin to self-publish, avoiding censorship. Witches and Stitches is an early example of viral phenomenon, quickly becoming popular with audiences around the world and Millikin's success inspired many artists to create their own webcomics. Copies of Witches and Stitches are now often difficult to find because Millikin was threatened with a lawsuit over the comic. Millikin's outspoken autobiographical style paved the way for other artists to express their thoughts and opinions on the web.
 Literally Impossible, a series of Op art paintings created as answers to questions from a literacy test used to deny voting rights to African-Americans in the American south before the Voting Rights Act of 1965. The paintings feature illusionary impossible objects, ambigrams and palindromes.
 Fetus-X, a series of alternative comics created in collaboration with Casey Sorrow. Fetus-X featured a psychic zombie fetus floating in a jar of formaldehyde who may or may not be Millikin's missing conjoined twin or his clone from an alternate timeline or dimension.  The comic was run for a short time in Michigan State University's The State News in 2000. After the Catholic League protested the comic and then MSU president M. Peter McPherson declared he wanted it banned, the comic strip was removed for being too controversial. During the controversy over the comic, many people protested on both sides of the issue. The comic was also published in other student newspapers like the University Reporter.
 Monkey Day, an international animal rights holiday. Monkey Day (celebrated December 14) was created and popularized by Millikin and Casey Sorrow in 2000 as an opportunity to educate the public about monkeys, as a holiday that supports evolution rather than religious themes, and an excuse to throw monkey-themed art shows and costume parties. For Monkey Day 2012, USA Weekend published Millikin's The 12 Stars of Monkey Day, a series of paintings that were "in part inspired by the many pioneering space monkeys who rode into the stars on rockets, leading the way for human space flight." For Monkey Day 2013, Millikin created a mail art series where he mailed Monkey Day cards to strangers, including Koko the sign-language gorilla and President Barack Obama. In 2014, Millikin debuted a series of monkey portraits using 3D film techniques.
 My Drinking Problem, a series of works of endurance performance art, known as "artistic drinking projects." These have included a "Pumpkin Space Odyssey," where Millikin consumed nothing but Pumpkin Spice Lattes for a month, drinking 150 cans of Vernors in just over two weeks for the ginger ale's 150th anniversary, and drinking enough Hi-C to use the empty drink boxes to brick up his own windows and those of Detroit art galleries.
 Very Serious Paper Cuts, a series of poems created using cut-up technique to create new poetry by cutting up and rearranging the pages of well-known books. For example, Millikin's Pride, Prejudice and Frankenstein contains twenty "experimental horrific love poems," each a variation on the same theme, with each starting with the beginning words of Jane Austen's Pride and Prejudice, ending with the final words of Mary Shelley's 1818 novel Frankenstein; or, The Modern Prometheus, and the middle words consisting of overlapping text from both sources. Other poems in this series have included The Arabian Nights Before Christmas, Romeo and Dracula and Juliet, and variations on Edgar Allan Poe's The Raven. These poems are then collected into books, with some books distributed by secretly placing on the shelves of libraries and bookstores, in what Millikin calls "reverse shoplifting."

Exhibitions and publications
Galleries and museums that have held exhibitions of Millikin's artwork include the Krannert Art Museum, The Laboratory of Art and Ideas at Belmar, and San Francisco's Cartoon Art Museum. Millikin has had group exhibitions with Marilyn Manson and HR Giger.

Millikin also distributes his artwork through college newspapers, in alternative newspapers such as the Metro Times, and in magazines like Wired. His work is also published in major daily newspapers like The Detroit News, Detroit Free Press, The Courier-Journal, The Des Moines Register, The Tennessean and USA Today.

Activism
Millikin is known for his political and social activism, with his artwork often tackling controversial issues. He has championed Barack Obama's Patient Protection and Affordable Care Act, commonly referred to as "Obamacare". Millikin has also championed green energy, ridiculing the "Drill, Baby, Drill Brigade" of "oil producers, free-market zealots and global warming deniers."

Millikin has also used his artwork to raise money for causes like helping Hurricane Katrina victims, fighting diseases like muscular dystrophy, and granting wishes to terminally ill children through the Make-A-Wish Foundation. He has also created posters campaigning to raise money for programs to improve adult literacy, auctioned artwork to support soup kitchen efforts to feed the hungry, and created artwork to help people in the city of Flint who had lead-contaminated water during the Flint water crisis.

Critical reaction
Millikin's artwork has won many awards from organizations including the Association of Alternative Newsmedia, Associated Press, Society of Professional Journalists, Investigative Reporters and Editors, National Association of Black Journalists, Online Journalism Awards, and the Society for News Design. His artwork critical of alleged lies by Detroit Mayor Kwame Kilpatrick was part of the portfolio that won the 2009 Pulitzer Prize in local reporting. The series resulted in Kilpatrick being sent to jail.

The American Library Association's Booklist describes how Millikin's expressionistic visual style "crosses Edvard Munch with an incipient victim of high-school suicide" and The Hindu describes his work as "haunting images." 

Syndicated newspaper editorial cartoonist Ted Rall describes Millikin's work as "one of the most interesting webcomics around," and former editor of The Comics Journal Tom Spurgeon named Millikin's work as belonging in the inaugural class of a webcomics hall of fame. The Webcomics Examiner named Millikin's comics one of the best webcomics, the webcomics blog ComixTalk named it one of the 100 Greatest Webcomics of all time, and The Washington Posts readers named it one of the top 10 finalists for Best Webcomic of the Past Decade in 2010. Millikin's work has also been nominated for multiple Web Cartoonists' Choice Awards, including their top honor of "Outstanding Comic". Millikin has been a panelist and guest at webcomic conventions, including the inaugural New England Webcomics Weekend, the first convention organized by and focusing on webcomic creators. The Sunday Times described serializer as "high-art",  and the Sydney Morning Herald considered them to be the avant-garde.
Millikin's artwork is given by Scott McCloud as an example of using the web to create "an explosion of diverse genres and styles" and is described as "mind-blowing" by Comic Book Resources.  The Comics Journal has written that Millikin's comics "use the newspaper format for far more daring, entertainingly perverse work" than most comics and is "perfectly at home at a good alternative weekly or a great college paper." The Webcomics Examiner has called Millikin's work "one of the sharpest political commentaries available." Millikin's projects have been published by Modern Tales and Webcomics Nation, where he was one of the all-time most popular artists. Millikin is one of the few, and first, webcomic creators successful enough to make a living as an artist.

His artworks advocating for U.S. government loans as a solution to the automotive industry crisis of 2008–2009 was described as a "gutsy move" that "stretch[es] the limits of the medium" and CNN's Kyra Phillips described it as "in your face". Congressman John D. Dingell displayed it on the House floor urging passage of government loans to automakers and reiterated the central theme of the piece, saying "now is the time for us to 'Invest in America'."

Millikin's work has also been praised by ESPN's Mike Tirico during a 2011 Monday Night Football half time show.

However, not all criticism of Millikin's artwork has been positive. Since 2000, Millikin has been the target of protest campaigns organized by the Catholic League for what they call his "blasphemous treatment of Jesus". "[Fetus-X] is offensive to Catholics and Christians," Catholic League spokesman Patrick Scully said in August 2002. "It completely ridicules the Catholic faith and is not funny." The Hartford Advocate has called Millikin a "borderline sociopath."

See also

References

External links
 
Eric Millikin blog

American bloggers
American comics writers
American humorists
American webcomic creators
Artificial intelligence art
Artists from Detroit
Horror artists
Living people
Michigan State University alumni
People from Royal Oak, Michigan
Place of birth missing (living people)
Pulitzer Prize for Local Reporting winners
Year of birth missing (living people)
21st-century American non-fiction writers